Skandamātā is the fifth among the Navadurga forms of Mahadevi. Her name comes from Skanda, an alternate name for the war god Kartikeya, and Mātā, meaning mother. As one of the Navadurga, the worship of Skandamātā takes place on the fifth day of Navaratri. Her abode is in Vishuddha chakra.

Symbolism

Skandamātā is four-armed, three-eyed, and rides on a lion. One of her hands is in the fear-dispelling Abhayamudra position while the other is used to hold the infant form of her son Skanda on her lap. Her remaining two hands are typically shown holding lotus flowers. She is light complexioned, and as she is often pictured seated on a lotus, she is sometimes referred to as Padamasani.

Significance 
It is believed that she rewards devotees with salvation, power, prosperity, and treasures. She can grant oceans of wisdom even to the illiterate if he happens to worship her. Skandamātā who possesses the brilliance of the sun, fulfils all the desires of her devotees. He who is selflessly devoted to her, attains all the achievements and treasures of life. The worship of Skandamātā purifies the heart of a devotee. While worshiping her, the devotee should have absolute control over his senses and mind. He should free himself from worldly bondage and worship her with a single-pointed devotion. Her worship is twice blessed. When the devotee worships her, Lord Skanda, her son in her lap, is automatically worshipped. Thus, the devotee happens to enjoy the grace of Skandmata along with the grace of Lord Skanda. If a devotee worships her devoid of selfishness, the Mother blesses them with power and prosperity. The devotees who worship Skandamātā shine with divine splendour. Her worship is ultimately conducive to salvation. She is regularly known as "The Goddess of Fire".

Prayers

Mantra 
ॐ देवी स्कन्दमातायै नम:

Oṃ Devī Skandamātāyai Namaḥ

सिंहासनगता नित्यं पद्माञ्चित करद्वया।

शुभदास्तु सदा देवी स्कन्दमाता यशस्विनी॥

या देवी सर्वभू‍तेषु माँ स्कन्दमाता रूपेण संस्थिता।

नमस्तस्यै नमस्तस्यै नमस्तस्यै नमो नमः॥

Simhasanagata Nityam Padmanchita Karadvaya।

Shubhadastu Sada Devi Skandamata Yashasvini॥

Ya Devi Sarvabhuteshu Ma Skandamata Rupena Samsthita।

Namastasyai Namastasyai Namastasyai Namo Namah॥

Dhyan Mantra 
सिंहासनगता नित्यं पद्माश्रितकरद्वया.
शुभदास्तु सदा देवी स्कन्दमाता यशस्विनी.
Sinhasangata nityam padmashritkardvya, 
Shubhdastu sada Devi Skandmata Yashswini

References

Dictionary of Hindu Lore and Legend by Anna Dhallapiccola

Hindu goddesses
Navadurgas
Mother goddesses
Childhood goddesses